Michael Shaw (16 July 1975 – 19 March 2012) was an English rugby league footballer who played for Leeds, Bramley, Rochdale Hornets and Halifax.

Playing career
Shaw started his professional career at Leeds, joining the club from Elland in 1993. In 1997, after playing 38 games for Leeds, he was loaned out to Bramley. In 1998, he joined Rochdale Hornets.

In July 1999, he was signed by Halifax, and made five Super League appearances for the club, scoring one try. He later went on to play for amateur club Siddal.

Death
In March 2012, Shaw died aged 36.

References

1975 births
2012 deaths
Bramley RLFC players
English rugby league players
Halifax R.L.F.C. players
Leeds Rhinos players
Rochdale Hornets players
Rugby league hookers
Rugby league players from Halifax, West Yorkshire